Joel Lanning (born November 18, 1994) is a former American football linebacker who is currently a graduate assistant for the Iowa State Cyclones football team. He played college football at Iowa State University. He was selected as a first-team All-American and first-team All-Big 12 in 2017.

Early years
Lanning was a multi-sport star at Ankeny High School earning all-state selections in football, baseball, and wrestling. In 2012 he won state championships in both baseball and football his senior seasons. As the three-year starting quarterback at Ankeny, Lanning had 7,642 all-purpose career yards.

Recruiting
After high school Lanning was very lightly recruited for football.  His only two offers were Nebraska and Iowa State; he ultimately picked the Cyclones.

College career

2015 season
Lanning redshirted his initial college season and only played in one game on special teams his freshman season.  In 2015, he played in 11 games and started quarterback for the final five. He finished the season with 1,247 passing yards and 10 passing touchdowns in addition to 330 rushing yards and four rushing touchdowns.  His season highs included 162 passing yards on 11 of 22 attempts and 130 yards rushing and two rushing touchdowns against Oklahoma State as well as throwing for three touchdowns and 210 yards against Kansas State.

2016 season
His junior season, Lanning was a threat through the air as well as on the ground. In addition to throwing for 1,290 yards and nine touchdowns he ran for 518 yard and led the team with 11 rushing touchdowns, this was the 10th most by FBS quarterbacks.  He was responsible for 20 of the Cyclone's 39 offensive touchdowns and ended the season with a streak of 121 consecutive passes without an interception.  Against Baylor he threw for 261 yards and two scores on 17 of 23 passes as well as running for 57 yards and an additional touchdown. Lanning had a career day against Texas Tech tying the school record for five rushing touchdowns in a game in addition to breaking the school record for rushing yards by a quarterback with 171 yards on 17 carries.

2017 season
At the end of the 2016 season Jacob Park took over as the full-time starting quarterback.  In an unheralded move during the off-season, head coach Matt Campbell asked Lanning to switch positions from quarterback to middle linebacker.  He was able to work up the depth chart and was the starting middle linebacker for the Cyclones opening game against UNI.  Despite starting on defense, Lanning continued to play special teams as well as wildcat quarterback in short yardage and goal line situations.  He finished the season leading the team in tackles, second in tackles for a loss, rushing yards, and rushing touchdowns.  Season highlights included eight tackles, 1.5 sacks, and an interception against Akron as well as 20 tackles against Texas. Lanning was named the Walter Camp Defensive Player of the Week after a standout performance against #3 Oklahoma that included eight tackles, a sack, a fumble recovery, nine rushing attempts for 35 yards and two passes for 25 yards.  In the match-up against Oklahoma State, Lanning had five tackles, half a sack, in addition to throwing a touchdown to Allen Lazard.

At the conclusion of the season he was selected as a first-team All-American and named to the first-team All-Big 12.

College statistics

Professional career

Dallas Cowboys
Lanning was signed as an undrafted free agent by the Dallas Cowboys after the 2018 NFL Draft on April 30. He was waived on September 1, 2018.

San Antonio Commanders (AAF)
On October 12, 2018, Lanning signed with the San Antonio Commanders of the Alliance of American Football. The league ceased operations in April 2019.

References

External links
Iowa State Cyclones bio
Will You Know No. 43’s Name By Time The Season Begins?

1994 births
Living people
People from Ankeny, Iowa
Players of American football from Iowa
American football linebackers
American football quarterbacks
Iowa State Cyclones football players
Dallas Cowboys players
San Antonio Commanders players